Keuppia is an extinct genus of octopus.

Taxonomy
It consists of two species, Keuppia hyperbolaris and Keuppia levante, both of which lived approximately 95 million years ago. Both species were found in fossilized form, which is very uncommon for extinct octopuses, as the soft tissue of dead octopuses almost always disintegrates before it has a chance to fossilize. These fossils, along with those of the genus Styletoctopus, were found from the Cretaceous-age Hâqel and Hjoula localities in Lebanon. The presence of a gladius vestige in this genus shows a transition from squid to octopus in which the inner shell has divided in two in early forms to eventually be reduced to lateralized stylets, as can be seen in Styletoctopus.

See also
2009 extinct fossil octopus discoveries

References

Octopuses
Prehistoric cephalopod genera
Fossil taxa described in 2009